High Roller: The Stu Ungar Story is a 2003 biopic focusing on the life of American professional poker and gin player Stu Ungar. Stuey is the film's alternate title. The film features cameos from several figures from the world of professional sports and poker, including Vince Van Patten, Andy Glazer and Al Bernstein.

Plot 
High Roller is told in flashback. Ungar (Michael Imperioli), in a motel room on the last night of his life, relates his personal story to a stranger (Michael Pasternak). He speaks of growing up as the son of a bookie, his career as a tournament gin player, moving into poker, his marriage and the birth of his daughter Stefanie, cocaine abuse, and the breakup of his marriage. The film climaxes with Ungar's third victory at the Main Event of the World Series of Poker a year before his passing. In the final scene, Ungar departs the motel room with the stranger (who apparently represents the Grim Reaper).

Cast
 Michael Imperioli as Stu Ungar
 Renee Faia as Angela 
 Michael Nouri as Vincent 
 Michael Pasternak as The Stranger
 Pat Morita as Mr. Leo 
 Vincent Van Patten as Jimmy D. 
 Cynthia Brimhall as Sondra 
 Al Bernstein as himself 
 Andrew N.S. Glazer as himself 
 Brian Kaplan as John Strzemp
 Jonathan Press as Young Stu
 Evan Broder as Goldstein 
 Todd Susman as Max Ungar 
 Tommy Cannary as Sol
 Peggy Walton-Walker as Flo Ungar
 A.W. Vidmer as Gin Victim
 Lon Gary as Poker Player
 David Dwyer as Poker Player
 Steve Schirripa as Anthony

Awards
 Nashville Film Festival Audience Choice Award - Best Feature (2003)
 PRISM Awards Commendation (2004)
 San Diego Film Festival Festival Award - Best Director (2003)

External links 
 

2003 films
2003 biographical drama films
American biographical drama films
Films about gambling
Films about poker
2003 drama films
2000s English-language films
2000s American films